Music at Night may refer to:

 Music at Night (book), a 1931 collection of essays by Aldous Huxley
 Music at Night (play), a 1938 play by J. B. Priestley